Ivan Antonovych Malkovych (born 10 May 1961 in , Ivano-Frankivsk) is a noted Ukrainian poet and publisher. He is the proprietor of the publishing house "A-BA-BA-HA-LA-MA-HA", which specializes in high quality (often illustrated) editions of Ukrainian literature and poetry, and has been a winner of many industry awards.

Biography
He completed his studies as a violinist at the Music college in Ivano-Frankivsk before entering Kiev University in 1978 where he majored in Ukrainian philology. He was noted by poet Dmytro Pavlychko who took him under his wing.

Malkovych was closely associated with the first Canadian-Ukrainian joint venture known as Kobza and was involved in the setting up of the Chervona Ruta festival of contemporary Music held in Chernivtsi in 1989.

Career
Malkovych published 6 collections of his own verse:
 "White Stone" («Білий камінь» 1984)
 "The Key" («Ключ» 1988)
 "Poems" («Вірші» (1992)
 "An Angel on my Shoulder" («Із янголом на плечі» 1997)
 "Winter Poems" («Вірші на зиму» (2006)
 "All that's near" («Все поруч» (2010)

References

Ukrainian publishers (people)
Ukrainian poets
Living people
1961 births
People from Ivano-Frankivsk Oblast
Taras Shevchenko National University of Kyiv alumni
Ukrainian violinists
21st-century violinists
Recipients of the Honorary Diploma of the Cabinet of Ministers of Ukraine